Biser Mihaylov (30 June 1943 – 12 August 2020) was a Bulgarian footballer who played as a goalkeeper. He spent all 14 seasons of his career at Levski Sofia, before retiring at the age of 32 in 1975.

Biography
Biser Mihaylov was born in Sofia, Bulgaria. His son, Borislav, also a goalkeeper, once held the record for the most caps for the Bulgarian national team (now second behind Stiliyan Petrov). Mihaylov's grandson, Nikolay, also a goalkeeper, currently plays for Levski Sofia and the Bulgarian national team.

Honours

Club
Levski Sofia
A Group: 1964–65, 1967–68, 1969–70, 1973–74
Bulgarian Cup: 1967, 1971

See also
 List of one-club men in association football

References

External links
 Player Profile at LevskiSofia.info
 

1943 births
2020 deaths
Bulgarian footballers
Association football goalkeepers
Bulgaria international footballers
PFC Levski Sofia players
First Professional Football League (Bulgaria) players
Footballers from Sofia